Donaghmore, near Lisronagh, County Tipperary, is a townland and the site of the ruins of St. Farannan's Church, which date from the 12th century.

External links 
360 Degree view of Donaghmore Church

Townlands of County Tipperary